Alexei Krivchenkov (born 11 June 1974) is a Russian former professional ice hockey defenceman. He was selected by the Pittsburgh Penguins in the 3rd round (76th overall) of the 1994 NHL Entry Draft.

Krivchenkov played in the Russian Superleague and Kontinental Hockey League for CSKA Moscow, Severstal Cherepovets, Sibir Novosibirsk, Vityaz Chekhov and Metallurg Novokuznetsk.

References

External links

1974 births
Living people
Cleveland Lumberjacks players
HC CSKA Moscow players
Hampton Roads Admirals players
Johnstown Chiefs players
Long Beach Ice Dogs (IHL) players
Metallurg Novokuznetsk players
People from Usolye-Sibirskoye
Pittsburgh Penguins draft picks
Russian ice hockey defencemen
Severstal Cherepovets players
HC Sibir Novosibirsk players
Syracuse Crunch players
HC Vityaz players
Sportspeople from Irkutsk Oblast